The 2019 Portland Thorns FC season is the team's and the league's seventh season of existence. The Thorns play in the National Women's Soccer League (NWSL), the top division of women's soccer in the United States. Due to construction at Providence Park, the Thorns would start the season with six consecutive away matches.

Team

Squad
Updated July 28, 2022, referencing same, to add #36 Angela Salem

Updated May 8, 2019

Competitions

Preseason

Thorns Spring Invitational

Regular season

Postseason playoffs

Regular-season standings

Results summary

Results by round

Statistical leaders

Top scorers

Top assists

Shutouts

Player Transactions

2019 NWSL College Draft
 Source: National Women's Soccer League

In

Out

Awards

NWSL Monthly Awards

NWSL Team of the Month

NWSL Weekly Awards

NWSL Player of the Week

NWSL Goal of the Week

NWSL Save of the Week

Notes

References

External links

See also
 2019 National Women's Soccer League season
 2019 in American soccer

Portland Thorns FC
Portland Thorns FC
Portland Thorns FC seasons